Daniel William Noble (born 21 September 1970) is an English former footballer who played in the Football League for Crewe Alexandra and Stoke City.

Career
Noble was born in Kingston upon Hull and played in the youth team at local side Hull City before he left for Stoke City in 1989. He made his debut for Stoke on the final day of the 1989–90 season at home against Swindon Town with Stoke already relegated to the third tier. He played just twice in 1990–91 conceding five goals and at the end of the season he was released. He signed for Crewe Alexandra and played nine times for the "Alex" before deciding to pursue a different career.

Career statistics
Source:

A.  The "Other" column constitutes appearances and goals in the Football League play-offs and Football League Trophy.

References

English footballers
Stoke City F.C. players
Crewe Alexandra F.C. players
English Football League players
1970 births
Living people
Association football goalkeepers